Rynoltice is a municipality and village in Liberec District in the Liberec Region of the Czech Republic. It has about 800 inhabitants.

Administrative parts
Villages of Černá Louže, Jítrava, Nová Starost and Polesí are administrative parts of Rynoltice.

Geography
It lies mostly in the Ralsko Uplands. The Panenský Stream springs on the slopes of Vápenný and flows across the municipality.

History
The first written mention of Rynoltice is from 1364. The village was founded in the 13th century by German colonists. During the Hussite Wars, the village was ransacked, and resettled again in 1563.

Transport
Rynoltice si located on the railway line leading from Liberec to Děčín.

Notable people
Johann Schicht (1855–1907), German Bohemian entrepreneur

References

External links

Villages in Liberec District